Cliniodes euphrosinalis is a moth in the family Crambidae. It was described by Heinrich Benno Möschler in 1886. It is found on the Greater Antilles and Lesser Antilles and in Costa Rica, southern Mexico (north to San Luis Potosí), northern Venezuela and Colombia.

Adults have been recorded on wing year round except September.

The larvae feed on Daphnopsis americana.

References

Moths described in 1886
Eurrhypini